Mrs. Wiggs of the Cabbage Patch is a 1914 American silent comedy drama film directed by Harold Entwistle and starring Beatriz Michelena, Blanche Chapman and House Peters. It is based on the 1904 Broadway play by Anne Crawford Flexner, which itself is taken from the 1901 novel of the same name by Alice Hegan Rice.

Plot 
Mr. and Mrs. Wiggs, prior to their marriage, worked as a coachman and housekeeper to Colonel Vanderhurst, who removed his son, Jack, from his will for marrying a woman connected to the circus. Years later, Jack and his wife both pass away, leaving Lovey Mary with Jack's wife's sister and her sister's husband, a temperamental circus proprietor. Along with Lovey Mary goes Jack's marriage certificate, Lovey Mary's birth certificate, and a locket with a portrait of Jack and his wife.

Now, Mr. and Mrs. Wiggs are married with five children, suffering greatly, especially due to strikes at Mr. Wiggs’ work. This place is controlled by wealthy politician Murphy, whose stepson Bob pities the strikers, specifically Mr. Wiggs and his family. Bob becomes an attorney and Mr. Wiggs leaves the town in search of other work, meeting Lovey Mary's uncle, the circus proprietor. With Mr. Wiggs absent, Mrs. Wiggs struggles greatly with poverty as she tries to take care of her family alone.

Years pass, and Mrs. Wiggs continues struggling. Colonel Vanderhurst decides to make a will in Lovey Mary's favor after regretting his harshness with his son. He releases advertisements to find Lovey Mary, which Mary's uncle finds and plans to turn in Lovey Mary as his own daughter to receive the inheritance.

Mr. Wiggs falls in love with a circus performer and has a child named Tommy with her, who Lovey Mary becomes fond of. When her uncle tells her the plan, she runs away with Tommy. Her uncle chases after her but she is rescued by Bob. She has another close call with her uncle, but escapes by train with Tommy, and stops near the Cabbage Patch. Noticed by one of the Wiggs children, she is taken to Mrs. Wiggs house. Soon, she is kidnapped by her uncle with Tommy still at the house.

Her uncle takes her to claim the inheritance, but Bob's firm represents the Colonel's estate and Bob becomes suspicious. He visits the circus, which is currently in the Cabbage Patch, and goes to Mrs. Wiggs, discovering the truth.

Bob follows Lovey Mary's uncle under disguise and saves her as she is about to be murdered. The two later run into Mr. Wiggs and convince him to return to Mrs. Wiggs, who forgives him for abandoning her and their family, and Bob and Lovey Mary announce their decision to get married.

Production and Reception 

Beatriz Michelena, who played Lovey Mary, and House Peters, who played Bob, had been on a film prior to the filming of Mrs. Wiggs of the Cabbage Patch with the California Motion Picture Corporation called Salomy Jane. Though Michelena held a special relationship with the California Motion Picture Corporation and received star treatment, she felt upstaged by Peters due to his acting style, which caused many problems during the production of Mrs. Wiggs of the Cabbage Patch. Michelena did not like play the film was based from and was angry that her role of Lovey Mary was not the title role, believing her role was not glamorous enough. Peters also disliked his lack of screen time as Bob. This led to an argument between the two and Peters storming off and never returning to the set. Producer George E. Middleton attempted to uphold continuity without the missing scenes, the gaps were too noticeable, and the film never became a success.

Cast
 Beatriz Michelena as Lovey Mary 
 Blanche Chapman as Mrs. Wiggs 
 Andrew Robson as Hiram Wiggs 
 House Peters as Bob 
 La Belle Carmen as Wire Walker 
 Belle Bennett as Undetermined Role 
 William Pike as Undetermined Role

References

Bibliography
 Goble, Alan. The Complete Index to Literary Sources in Film. Walter de Gruyter, 1999.

External links
 
The Golden Gate and the Silver Screen on Google Books

1914 films
1914 drama films
1910s English-language films
American silent feature films
Silent American drama films
Films directed by Harold Entwistle
American black-and-white films
World Film Company films
Films shot in Fort Lee, New Jersey
Films based on works by Alice Hegan Rice
1910s American films